Mayo Jane Methot (March 3, 1904 – June 9, 1951) was an American film and stage actress. She appeared in over 30 films, as well as in various Broadway productions, though she attracted significant media attention for her tempestuous marriage to actor Humphrey Bogart.

She appeared in numerous Broadway musicals and plays, including the Vincent Youmans musical Great Day (1929). She then appeared in various supporting roles for Warner Brothers, often portraying hard-edged women. Her film credits include the mystery film The Night Club Lady (1932), the comedy Jimmy the Gent (1934), and the crime drama Marked Woman (1937).

Methot met Humphrey Bogart on the set of Marked Woman, and the two became romantically involved, marrying in 1938. Methot struggled with severe alcoholism, and was diagnosed with paranoid schizophrenia following a suicide attempt in 1943. She divorced Bogart in 1945 after numerous reconciliations. Unable to gain traction in her film career, she returned to her native Portland, and her alcoholism and depression worsened. She died of complications stemming from alcoholism in 1951, aged 47.

Life and career

1904–1922: Early life and career beginnings

Mayo Jane Methot was born March 3, 1904, in Chicago, Illinois, the only child of Beryl Evelyn (née Wood) and John Dillon "Jack" Methot, a ship captain. She was a direct descendant of Zachary Taylor, the 12th President of the United States. Shortly after her birth, the family relocated to Portland, Oregon, where Methot was raised. She showed a proclivity for literature and acting as a young child, memorizing passages from Romeo and Juliet. She began performing on stage professionally at the age of five, appearing as Josef in a Portland production of Sapho, opposite Florence Roberts.

In 1912, Methot starred as David, a young boy, in a production of The Awakening of Helena Richie, at the Grand Opera House in Salem, Oregon. In an article detailing the play, it was noted: "Her grasp of what is required of her during rehearsals of plays is held to be most unusual, while those who have seen her as David in The Awakening of Helena Richie, are warm in their praise of her dramatic ability." In press promoting the production, the then-eight-year-old Methot stated that she was inspired by French actress Sarah Bernhardt. Around this time, she told reporter Fay King of The Spectator: "I'm going to be a fine actress, if I can."

Methot was subsequently chosen to travel with selected Portland delegates to Washington, D.C. where she presented President Woodrow Wilson with a bouquet of flowers. Methot began performing with the Portland-based Baker Stock Company at age nine, and her frequent appearances in local theater productions earned Methot the nickname "The Portland Rosebud." In 1914, she made her film debut alongside several Baker Stock Company players in a serial short titled Forgotten Songs, produced by the Portland-based American Lifeograph Studios. In January 1916, she starred as the lead in a Baker Stock Company production of The Littlest Rebel.

After Methot graduated from Miss Catlin's School in 1919, she pursued a full-time career with the Baker Stock Company, appearing in an August 1919 production of Come Out of the Kitchen opposite Verna Felton. This was followed by lead roles in the company's Dawn o' the Mountains (staged in May 1920), in which she portrayed a teenage boy; as a bride's sister seeking a lover in Parlor, Bedroom and Bath (October 1920); and in the comedy That Girl Patsy, in May 1921.

While appearing in locally produced serial short films for filmmaker Robert C. Bruce (among them the 1922-released And Women Must Weep), Methot met cameraman Jack Lamond, a war veteran, and the two began a whirlwind romance in the summer of 1921. On September 21 of that year, they married at Saint Luke's Episcopal Church in Vancouver, Washington. Methot continued to perform in local productions with the Baker Stock Company, including Linger Longer Letty in November 1921, and in a revival of Parlor, Bedroom and Bath in March 1922. In November 1922, Methot and Lamond relocated to New York City, where Lamond was employed at Cosmopolitan Productions.

1923–1929: Broadway career

Shortly after her arrival in New York, Methot began appearing on Broadway, her first production being director William Brady's The Mad Honeymoon in the summer of 1923. Though the play received unfavorable reviews from critics, Mayo was the lone member of the cast to not receive criticism for her performance.

Based on her performance in The Mad Honeymoon, Methot was cast as the female lead of Leola Lane in George M. Cohan's production of The Song and Dance Man, which opened on New Year's Eve 1923. In 1924, she appeared as The Bride in a Philadelphia production of Owen Davis's The Haunted House. The following year, she returned to Broadway as Phyllis Halladay in Alias the Deacon, opposite Berton Churchill. This was followed by a 1927 production of The Medicine Man, staged by Sam H. Harris at the New Cort Theatre in Queens, New York City. On December 30, 1927, Methot and Lamond divorced, after she asserted that he had deserted her in 1925.

Methot's performance as Florence Wendell in a winter 1929 Broadway production of All the King's Men garnered her praise from Donald Mulhern of the Brooklyn Standard Union, who wrote that she "handles her emotional scenes with both art and warmth and makes the woman very real." She subsequently originated a role in the Vincent Youmans/Billy Rose musical Great Day (1929), introducing the standard "More Than You Know" and several others. Her subsequent performance in Half Gods (also 1929) at the Plymouth Theatre earned critical praise, with Alvin Kayton of The Brooklyn Citizen writing: "As Hope Ferrier, Mayo Methot, recently in Youmans' Great Day, was extraordinarily capable, expressing her part with an emotion and understanding which made Hope seem almost lifelike. We doubt if the role could have been bettered."

1930–1937: Move to Hollywood
 
Methot moved to Hollywood in 1930, hoping to transition from stage to a career in film. She had her first major speaking role in United Artists's gangster film Corsair (1931). On November 28, 1931, Methot married Percy T. Morgan, an oil tycoon and the co-owner with John "Jack" Morgan, of the Cock n' Bull restaurant on Hollywood's Sunset Boulevard, birthplace of the Moscow Mule.

In 1932, after signing a contract with Warner Bros., Methot starred as the female lead in The Night Club Lady, a murder mystery co-starring Adolphe Menjou. What followed was a long line of roles as unsympathetic second leads and tough-talking "dames" in many of Warner's contemporary crime melodramas, such as The Mind Reader and William Wyler's Counsellor at Law (both 1933), as well as Jimmy the Gent (1934) opposite Jimmy Cagney and Bette Davis. In 1934, she had roles in three First National Pictures features: first as a nurse in the drama Registered Nurse, followed by supporting parts in Side Streets and Mills of the Gods.

Methot followed this with minor parts in the Perry Mason mystery film The Case of the Curious Bride, and as a gangster's moll in the crime film Dr. Socrates (both released in 1935). She was subsequently cast in the crime drama Marked Woman (1937), again starring opposite Davis and Humphrey Bogart. Methot divorced her husband, Percy Morgan, in February 1937, claiming that he would not allow her to accept an acting role in New York City.

1938–1944: Marriage to Humphrey Bogart

Methot became romantically involved with Humphrey Bogart after co-starring with him in Marked Woman. The couple were married on August 28, 1938, in Beverly Hills. Bogart had been married to actresses Helen Menken and Mary Philips before marrying Methot, and blamed his previous divorces on his wives' careers and their long separations. Two years after Methot and Bogart were married, Methot gave up acting. The two became a high-profile Hollywood couple, but it was not a smooth marriage. Both drank heavily, and Methot gained a reputation for her violent excesses when under the influence. They became known in the press as "The Battling Bogarts", with Methot known, due to her combativeness, as "Sluggy". Bogart later named his motor yacht Sluggy in her honor. After Methot attempted suicide in 1943, Bogart urged her to visit a psychiatrist, and upon doing so, she was diagnosed with paranoid schizophrenia.

During World War II, the Bogarts traveled Europe entertaining the troops. At one point in their travels during the war, the Bogarts met with director John Huston in Italy. During a night of heavy drinking, Methot insisted that everyone listen to her perform a song. Though they tried to persuade her to desist, she sang anyway. The performance was so bad and embarrassing that Huston and Bogart remembered it several years later and based a scene in Key Largo (1948) on the incident. It is the scene in which the alcoholic girlfriend (played by Claire Trevor) of the mobster (played by Edward G. Robinson) sings "Moanin' Low" off key, hoping to win a drink in exchange for the song.

Numerous battles took place at the Hollywood residence of the famous couple, nicknamed Sluggy Hollow, including one in which Methot stabbed Bogart in the shoulder, and another in which the two hit one another in the head with whiskey bottles. Actress Gloria Stuart—a friend of Bogart and Methot—recalled, in her later years, attending a dinner party at which Methot drunkenly brandished a pistol and threatened to shoot Bogart. Stuart also recalled seeing Methot with bruises on her face on several occasions, and witnessing physical fights between the couple, including one in which Bogart tore Methot's dress off of her. The couple separated and reconciled several times over the course of their marriage.

While filming To Have and Have Not in 1943, Bogart fell in love with his 19-year old co-star Lauren Bacall and the couple began an affair. Methot caught wind of the affair and visited the set often. Bogart attempted to save the marriage but Methot's alcoholism intensified as did their fighting. Bogart announced that he had moved out of the couple's home on October 19, 1944. On October 30, Bogart announced that he had reconciled with Methot and that he was "going home. [...] In other words, we'll return to our normal battles." The reconciliation proved to be short lived; Methot announced that Bogart had moved out of their home yet again on December 3, 1944.

1945–1951: Career decline and return to Oregon
Methot filed for divorce on May 10, 1945, in a Las Vegas court. The divorce was granted one hour after she filed the decree. Bogart married Lauren Bacall on May 21, 1945. After the divorce, Methot retreated from the public eye for several months, and spent a period at the Malabar Farm State Park (the location of Bogart and Bacall's wedding).

In August 1945, Methot attempted to resume a stage career in New York. However, she was unable to renew the career that she had given up, and became locked into a pattern of alcoholism and depression. In the late 1940s, she moved back to Oregon where her mother helped take care of her.

Death
Methot died on June 9, 1951, at Holladay Park Hospital in Portland. Though the press at the time reported that Methot died during an unspecified surgery, her actual cause of death was attributed to acute alcoholism. Methot left her estate, totaling $50,000 (equivalent to $500,538 in 2020) to her mother Evelyn. Additionally, she bestowed her personal library of classic books to the Catlin Gabel School, her alma mater, as well a scholarship fund for the institution.

Methot's remains are interred at the Portland Memorial Mausoleum in the Sellwood neighborhood of Portland, Oregon, alongside her parents. Bogart continued to send flowers to Methot's crypt until his death in 1957.

Filmography

Select stage credits

Notes and references

Notes

References

Sources

External links

 
 
 Biographical sketch at the University of Oregon
 still of Methot as a child actress
 

1904 births
1951 deaths
20th-century American actresses
Actresses from Portland, Oregon
Alcohol-related deaths in Oregon
American child actresses
American film actresses
American musical theatre actresses
American silent film actresses
American stage actresses
Burials at Portland Memorial Mausoleum
Catlin Gabel School alumni
Warner Bros. contract players
20th-century American singers
20th-century American women singers
People with schizophrenia